Nicolás Almagro was the defending champion, but lost in the semifinals to Fernando Verdasco.

8th seed Marcel Granollers won the title. He defeated his compatriot, 4th seed Fernando Verdasco in the final, 6–4, 3–6, 6–3.

Seeds
The first four seeds received a bye into the second round.

Qualifying

Draw

Finals

Top half

Bottom half

References
 Main draw

Credit Agricole Suisse Open Gstaad - Singles
2011 Singles
2011 Crédit Agricole Suisse Open Gstaad